Centroplacus is a genus of the family Centroplacaceae. It was formerly classified in the Phyllanthaceae and given its own tribe, the Centroplaceae. It contains a single species, Centroplacus glaucinus.

General information 
C. glaucinus is an understorey tree, usually at low elevations, growing up to 20 metres tall; a dioecious species, flowers unisexual (male and female forms).

Range 
Centroplacus occurs in West tropical Africa (Cameroon, Equatorial Guinea, Gabon).

References

Centroplacaceae
Monotypic Malpighiales genera
Dioecious plants